Detroit Arsenal (DTA), formerly Detroit Arsenal Tank Plant (DATP) was the first manufacturing plant ever built for the mass production of tanks in the United States. Established in 1940 under Chrysler, the plant was owned by the U.S. government until 1996. It was designed by architect Albert Kahn. The building was designed originally as a "dual production facility", so that it could make armaments and be turned into peaceful production at war's end. Notwithstanding its name, the  site was located in Warren, Michigan, Detroit's most populous suburb.

History

Chrysler's construction effort at the plant in 1941 was one of the fastest on record. The first tanks rumbled out of the plant before its complete construction.

During World War II, the Detroit Arsenal Tank Plant built a quarter of the 89,568 tanks produced in the U.S. overall. The plant made M3 Lee tanks while the buildings were still being raised and switched to M4 Sherman tanks in 1942. The Korean War boosted production for the first time since World War II had ended; the government would suspend tank production after each war. In May 1952, Chrysler resumed control from the army, which had been unable to ramp up production.

As a government-owned, contractor operated (GOCO) facility, Chrysler retained operational control of the production facility until March 1982, when Chrysler sold its Chrysler Defense division to General Dynamics Land Systems. General Dynamics produced the M1 Abrams tank at the facility (and at another plant in Lima, Ohio) until 1996, when the plant was closed and tank assembly and maintenance operations were consolidated at the Lima plant. The plant and some of the adjoining property were transferred to the City of Warren in 2001. The site of the original tank plant has been parcelled up and is now dedicated to civilian uses.

This important production site of the Arsenal of Democracy is memorialized by a Michigan Historical Marker.

The structure of the plant was designed to survive bombardment by the weapons of the day. It included  concrete walls in some areas and a reinforced roof with slats to direct bombs away from vulnerable windows and exhaust fans.

The portion of the property not sold to the city remains an active Army facility with many agencies present. The installation is managed by Installation Management Command (IMCOM) and hosts the headquarters of the United States Army CCDC Ground Vehicle Systems Center (GVSC), formerly United States Army Tank Automotive Research, Development and Engineering Center (TARDEC), and it hosts the United States Army TACOM Life Cycle Management Command. TACOM continues to function at the location, and experienced a major building boom in the 2010s.

Tenant units 
United States Army CCDC Ground Vehicle Systems Center
United States Army TACOM Life Cycle Management Command TACOM LCMC

Tanks produced 
 M3 Lee, 1941–1942
 M4 Sherman, 1941–1945
 M26 Pershing, 1945
 M46 Patton, 1949
 M47 Patton, 1951–1953
 M67 "Zippo", 1955–1956
 M60 Patton, 1960–1987
 M1 Abrams, 1980–1996

References

Further reading

.
Detroit Arsenal Tank Plant, Local Legacies. Library of Congress
, Ann M. and Talbot, Randy (June 2001). [https://web.archive.org/web/20080304200241/http://www.michiganhistorymagazine.com/extra/tanks/tanks.pdf Bos "Enough and On Time, The Story of the Detroit Arsenal Tank Plant", [[Michigan History (magazine)}Michigan History]]. 
Meredith, Robyn (December 21, 1996). "Vast Plant for Tanks Has Closed". The New York Times.

External links
Detroit Arsenal of Democracy Museum, Veterans' Memorial Park, 27400 Campbell Road, Warren, Michigan 48093

"Tanks Are Mighty Fine Things", a booklet about the WW2 History of the Detroit Tank Arsenal

Congressional Record , remarks on the dedication of the Michigan Historical Marker concerning the Detroit Arsenal Tank Plant by U.S. Senator Carl Levin
Description of Detroit Arsenal Tank Plant at Globalsecurity.org
Detroit Tank Arsenal in Warren Township, 1941
U.S. Army Tank Automotive Command history
Wikimapia, Detroit Arsenal Tank Plant

Warren, Michigan
Buildings and structures in Macomb County, Michigan
Detroit Arsenal Tank Plant
Historic American Engineering Record in Michigan
United States Army Materiel Command
1940 establishments in Michigan
Armories in Michigan
Industrial buildings and structures in Michigan